The 2015 season was FC Kansas City's third season of existence. The team competes in the National Women's Soccer League, the top division of women's soccer in the United States.

First-team squad

Match results

Preseason

National Women's Soccer League

Regular season

Postseason playoff

Regular-season standings 

Results summary

Squad statistics
Source: NWSL

Key to positions: FW – Forward, MF – Midfielder, DF – Defender, GK – Goalkeeper

Notes

References

External links
 

FC Kansas City
FC Kansas City seasons
FC Kansas City
FC Kansas City